Afrocentric education is a pedagogical system designed to empower peoples of the African diaspora with educational modes in contact and in line with the cultural assumptions common in their communities. A central premise behind it is that many Africans have been subjugated by having their awareness of themselves limited and by being indoctrinated with ideas that work against them and their cultures.

Like educational leaders of other cultures, proponents assert that what educates one group of people does not necessarily educate and empower another group, so they assert educational priorities distinctly for the Africans in a given context.

Philosophy
Afrocentric education has, as one of its tenets, the decolonization of the African mind. The central objective in decolonizing the African mind is to overthrow the authority that alien traditions may exercise.

Education
The term "miseducation" was coined by Carter G. Woodson to describe the process of systematically depriving African Americans of their knowledge of self.  Woodson believed that miseducation was the root of the problems of the masses of the African-American community and that if the masses of the African-American community were given the correct knowledge and education from the beginning, they would not be in the situation that they find themselves in today.  Woodson argues in his book The Mis-Education of the Negro that African Americans often valorize European culture to the detriment of their own culture.

History
This has been an active area of Afrocentrism for many decades.

19th and early 20th century
Edward Wilmot Blyden, an American-Liberian educator and diplomat active in the pan-Africa movement, perceived a change in perception taking place among Europeans towards Africans in his 1908 book African Life and Customs, which originated as a series of articles in the Sierra Leone Weekly News. In it, he proposed that Africans were beginning to be seen simply as different and not as inferior, in part because of the work of English writers such as Mary Kingsley and Lady Lugard, who traveled and studied in Africa. Such an enlightened view was fundamental to refute prevailing ideas among Western peoples about African cultures and Africans.

Blyden used that standpoint to show how the traditional social, industrial, and economic life of Africans untouched by "either European or Asiatic influence", was different and complete in itself, with its own organic wholeness. In a letter responding to Blyden's original series of articles, Fante journalist and politician J. E. Casely Hayford commented, "It is easy to see the men and women who walked the banks of the Nile" passing him on the streets of Kumasi. Hayford suggested building a university to preserve African identity and instincts. In that university, the history chair would teach

The exchange of ideas between Blyden and Hayford embodied the fundamental concepts of Afrocentrism.

In the United States, during the early 20th century and the Harlem Renaissance, many writers and historians gathered in major cities, where they began to work on documenting achievements of Africans throughout history, in United States and Western life. They began to set up institutions to support scholarly work in African-American history and literature, such as the American Negro Academy (now the Black Academy of Letters and Arts), founded in Washington, DC, in 1874.  Some men were self-taught; others rose through the academic system. Creative writers and artists claimed space for African-American perspectives.

Leaders included bibliophile Arthur Schomburg, who devoted his life to collecting literature, art, slave narratives, and other artifacts of the African diaspora. In 1911, along with John Edward Bruce, he founded the Negro Society for Historical Research in Yonkers, New York.  The value of Schomburg's personal collection was recognized, and it was purchased by the New York Public Library in 1926 with the aid of a Carnegie Corporation grant.  It became the basis of what is now called the Schomburg Center for Research in Black Culture, based in Harlem, New York. Schomburg used the money from the sale of his collection for more travel and acquisition of materials.

Hubert Henry Harrison used his intellectual gifts in street lectures and political activism, influencing early generations of Black Socialists and Black Nationalists.  Dr. Carter G. Woodson co-founded the Association for the Study of African American Life and History (as it is now called) in 1915, as well as The Journal of Negro History, so that scholars of black history could be supported and find venues for their work.

Among their topics, editors of publications such as NAACP's The Crisis and  Journal of Negro History sought to include articles that countered the prevailing view that Sub-Saharan Africa had contributed little of value to human history that was not the result of incursions by Europeans and Arabs. Historians began to theorize that Ancient Egyptian civilization was the culmination of events arising from the origin of the human race in Africa. They investigated the history of Africa from that perspective.

In March 1925, Schomburg published an essay "The Negro Digs Up His Past" in an issue of the Survey Graphic devoted to Harlem's intellectual life.  The article had widespread distribution and influence, as he detailed the achievements of people of African descent. Alain Locke included the essay in his collection The New Negro.

Afrocentrists claimed The Mis-Education of the Negro (1933) by Carter G. Woodson, an African-American historian, as one of their foundational texts. Woodson critiqued education of African Americans as "mis-education" because he held that it denigrated the black while glorifying the white. For these early Afrocentrists, the goal was to break what they saw as a vicious cycle of the reproduction of black self-abnegation.  In the words of The Crisis editor W. E. B. Du Bois, the world left African Americans with a "double consciousness," and a sense of "always looking at one's self through the eyes of others, of measuring one's soul by the tape of a world that looks on in amused contempt and pity."

In his early years, W. E. B. Du Bois, researched West African cultures and attempted to construct a pan-Africanist value system based on West African traditions. In the 1950s Du Bois envisioned and received funding from Ghanaian president Kwame Nkrumah to produce an Encyclopedia Africana to chronicle the history and cultures of Africa.  Du Bois died before being able to complete his work. Some aspects of Du Bois's approach are evident in work by Cheikh Anta Diop in the 1950s and 1960s.

Du Bois inspired a number of authors, including Drusilla Dunjee Houston. After reading his work The Negro (1915), Houston embarked upon writing her Wonderful Ethiopians of the Ancient Cushite Empire (1926).  The book was a compilation of evidence related to the historic origins of Cush and Ethiopia, and assessed their influences on Greece.

1960s and 1970s
The 1960s and 1970s were times of social and political ferment. In the U.S. were born new forms of Black Nationalism, Black Power and the Black Arts Movements, all began to be driven, to a degree, driven to some degree by an identification with "Mother Africa."  Afrocentric scholars and Black youth also challenged Eurocentric ideas in academia.

The work of Cheikh Anta Diop became very influential.  In the following decades, histories related to Africa and the diaspora gradually incorporated a more African perspective. Since that time, Afrocentrists have increasingly seen African peoples as the makers and shapers of their own histories.

You have all heard of the African Personality; of African democracy, of the African way to socialism, of negritude, and so on. They are all props we have fashioned at different times to help us get on our feet again. Once we are up we shan't need any of them any more. But for the moment it is in the nature of things that we may need to counter racism with what Jean-Paul Sartre has called an anti-racist racism, to announce not just that we are as good as the next man but that we are much better.
—Chinua Achebe, 1965

In this context, ethnocentric Afrocentrism was not intended to be essential or permanent, but was a consciously fashioned strategy of resistance to the Eurocentrism of the time. Afrocentric scholars adopted two approaches: a deconstructive rebuttal of what they called "the whole archive of European ideological racism" and a reconstructive act of writing new self-constructed histories.

At a 1974 UNESCO symposium in Cairo titled "The Peopling of Ancient Egypt and the Decipherment of Meroitic Script", Cheikh Anta Diop brought together scholars of Egypt from around the world.

Key texts from this period include:
 The Destruction of Black Civilization (1971) by Chancellor Williams
 The African Origins of Civilization: Myth or Reality (1974) by Cheikh Anta Diop
 They Came Before Columbus: The African Presence in Ancient America (1976) by Ivan Van Sertima

Some Afrocentric writers focused on study of indigenous African civilizations and peoples, to emphasize African history separate from European or Arab influence. Primary among them was Chancellor Williams, whose book  The Destruction of Black Civilization: Great Issues of a Race from 4500 B.C. to 2000 A.D. set out to determine a "purely African body of principles, value systems (and) philosophy of life".

1980s and 1990s
In the 1980s and 1990s, Afrocentrism increasingly became seen as a tool for addressing social ills and a means of grounding community efforts toward self-determination and political and economic empowerment.

In his (1992) article "Eurocentrism vs. Afrocentrism", US anthropologist Linus A. Hoskins wrote:
The vital necessity for African people to use the weapons of education and history to extricate themselves from this psychological dependency complex/syndrome as a necessary precondition for liberation. [...] If African peoples (the global majority) were to become Afrocentric (Afrocentrized), ... that would spell the ineluctable end of European global power and dominance. This is indeed the fear of Europeans. ... Afrocentrism is a state of mind, a particular subconscious mind-set that is rooted in the ancestral heritage and communal value system.

American educator Jawanza Kunjufu made the case that hip hop culture, rather than being creative expression of the culture, was the root of many social ills. For some Afrocentrists, the contemporary problems of the ghetto stemmed not from race and class inequality, but rather from a failure to inculcate Black youth with Afrocentric values.

In the West and elsewhere, the European, in the midst of other peoples, has often propounded an exclusive view of reality; the exclusivity of this view creates a fundamental human crisis.  In some cases, it has created cultures arrayed against each other or even against themselves.  Afrocentricity’s response certainly is not to impose its own particularity as a universal, as Eurocentricity has often done.  But hearing the voice of African American culture with all of its attendant parts is one way of creating a more sane society and one model for a more humane world. –Asante, M. K. (1988)

In 1997, US cultural historian Nathan Glazer described Afrocentricity as a form of multiculturalism.  He wrote that its influence ranged from sensible proposals about inclusion of more African material in school curricula to what he called senseless claims about African primacy in all major technological achievements. Glazer argued that Afrocentricity had become more important due to the failure of mainstream society to assimilate all African Americans.  Anger and frustration at their continuing separation gave black Americans the impetus to reject traditions that excluded them.

2000s
Today, Afrocentricity takes many forms, including striving for a more multicultural and balanced approach to the study of history and sociology. Afrocentrists contend that race still exists as a social and political construct. They argue that for centuries in academia, Eurocentric ideas about history were dominant: ideas such as blacks having no civilizations, no written languages, no cultures, and no histories of any note before coming into contact with Europeans. Further, according to the views of some Afrocentrists, European history has commonly received more attention within the academic community than the history of sub-Saharan African cultures or those of the many Pacific Island peoples. Afrocentrists contend it is important to divorce the historical record from past racism. Molefi Kete Asante's book Afrocentricity (1988) argues that African-Americans should look to African cultures "as a critical corrective to a displaced agency among Africans." Some Afrocentrists believe that the burden of Afrocentricity is to define and develop African agency in the midst of the cultural wars debate.  By doing so, Afrocentricity can support all forms of multiculturalism.

Afrocentrists argue that Afrocentricity is important for people of all ethnicities who want to understand African history and the African diaspora. For example, the Afrocentric method can be used to research African indigenous culture. Queeneth Mkabela writes in 2005 that the Afrocentric perspective provides new insights for understanding African indigenous culture, in a multicultural context. According to Mkabela and others, the Afrocentric method is a necessary part of complete scholarship and without it, the picture is incomplete, less accurate, and less objective.

Studies of African and African-diaspora cultures have shifted understanding and created a more positive acceptance of influence by African religious, linguistic and other traditions, both among scholars and the general public. For example, religious movements such as Vodou are now less likely to be characterized as "mere superstition", but understood in terms of links to African traditions.

In recent years Africana Studies or Africology departments at many major universities have grown out of the Afrocentric "Black Studies" departments formed in the 1970s. Rather than focusing on black topics in the African diaspora (often exclusively African American topics), these reformed departments aim to expand the field to encompass all of the African diaspora. They also seek to better align themselves with other University departments and find continuity and compromise between the radical Afrocentricity of the past decades and the multicultural scholarship found in many fields today.

African Centered Leadership-Fellowship (ACL-F)
2000

Dr. Uhuru Hotep, co-director of the Kwame Ture Leadership Institute, established an ethnocentric approach to leadership specifically based on the four principles of restoration of sovereignty, Sankofa, Maat restoration, and Johari Sita installation.

Restoration of sovereignty is a concept that surrounds cultural, political and economic entities of society. Sovereignty is synyonmous with self-determination. In the tradition of a self-sufficient creation of communities, seshemet (leadership) was developed to restore the Moroon tradition of kilombo construction.

Sankofa is a leadership technique of Ghana that emphasizes living in the present to learn from the past. This concept requires its followers to learn about the contributions of their ancestral leaders and to continue with their struggles. It mandates that African centered leaders reconnect with their ancestors.

Maat restoration is a collaboration of the central themes of truth, justice, order, harmony, balance, reciprocity and propriety. which is based on the teachings of ancient Kemet. This concept is characterized by the restoring of public confidence and the promotion of psychological and fiscal prosperity among the leaders and their followers.

Johari Sita is a multifaceted Afrocentric approach to leadership-followership development. It can best be described as the processes, procedures and practices of ACL-F. This model of leadership is the foundation for nationwide workshops called "Preparing African Youth for 21st Century Leadership and Service."

The internal loci of control for Africa centered leaders and followers are contrary to the political and financial dependency of followers of external loci of control of many mainstream middle class Black American leadership practices.

List of schools

Public schools 
 African-Centered College Preparatory Academy (Kansas City, Missouri)
 Columbus Africentric Early College (Columbus, Ohio)

Public charter schools 
 Betty Shabazz International Charter School (Chicago, Illinois)
 Imhotep Institute Charter High School (Philadelphia, Pennsylvania)

See also

 Pedagogy
 Philosophy of education
 Afrocentrism
 Africana studies
 Black nationalism
 Black separatism
 Afrikan Centered Education Collegium Campus

References

Notes

Resources
 Woodson, Dr. Carter G. (1933). The Mis-Education of the Negro.  Booksellers & Associates.
 Chinweizu (1987). Decolonizing the African Mind. Sundoor Press.
 Pollard Diane S., et al.(2000). African-Centered Schooling in Theory and Practice. Bergin & Garvey.

Further reading
 Molefi Kete Asante (1980). Afrocentricity: The theory of social change. Amulefi Pub. Co.
 Kondo, Zak. Black Students Guide to Positive Education.
 Goggins II, Lathardus. "African Centered Rites of Passage and Education".
 Gill, Walter. Issues in African American Education.
 Cartwright, Madeline. For the Children.
 Zaslavsky, Claudia. Africa Counts.
 Hilliard III, Asa G. SBA: The Reawakening of the African Mind.
 Hilliard III, Asa G. Maroons Within Us.
 Hilliard III, Asa G., et al. Young, Gifted and Black.
 Hilliard III, Asa G., Payton-Stewart, Lucretia, Williams, Larry Obadele. Infusion of African and African American Content in the School Curriculum.
 Palmer, Anyim. The Failure of Public Education in the Black Community.
 Foluke, Gyasi A. The Crisis and Challenge of Black Mis-Education in America.
 DuBois, W. E. B., and Herbert Aptheker. The Education of Black People.
 Lomotey, Kofi. Going to School:  the African American Experience.
 Akoto, Kwame Agyei. Nationbuilding: Theory and practice in Afrikan-centered education.
 Shujaa, Mwalimu J. Too Much Schooling, Too Little Education.
 Lometey, Kofi. Sailing Against the Wind: African Americans and Women in U.S. Education.
 Richard Majors. Educating Our Black Children: New Directions and Radical Approaches.
 Hale, Janice E. Unbank the Fire: Visions for the Education of African American Children.
 Watkins, William H. The White Architects of Black Education: Ideology and Power in America, 1865–1954
 Denbo, Sheryl. Improving Schools for African American Students:  A Reader for Educational Leaders.
 Ani, Marimba. Yurugu: An African-Centered Critique of European Cultural Thought and Behavior.
 Murrell Jr., Peter C. African-Centered Pedagogy: Developing Schools of Achievement for African American Children.
 Ford, Donna Y. Reversing Underachievement Among Gifted Black Students.
 Ratteray, Joan D. Center Shift:  An African-Centered Approach for the Multi-Cultural Curriculum.
 Tatum, Beverly Daniel. Why Are All The Black Kids Sitting Together in the Cafeteria.
 Gentry, Atron A. Learning to Survive:  Black Youth Look for Education and Hope.
 Kafele, Baruti K. A Black Parent’s Handbook to Educating Your Children (Outside of the Classroom)
 Shockley, Kmt G. The Miseducation of Black Children.

External links
 Journal of Negro Education

Afrocentrism
Philosophy of education